Aphelinus is a genus of parasitoid wasps. Several of the species are important because they parasitize agricultural pests, such as the soybean aphid (Aphis glycines) or the Russian wheat aphid -Diuraphis noxia - (A. albipodus Hayat & Fatima, A. asychis Walker, and A. varipes (Foerster).

About 100 species have been described.

Partial species list
Aphelinus abdominalis Dalman
Aphelinus albipodus Hayat & Fatima
Aphelinus asychis Walker 
Aphelinus certus
Aphelinus chaonia Walker
Aphelinus flaviventris Kurdjumov
Aphelinus humilis Mercet
Aphelinus lapisligni Howard 
Aphelinus mali (Haldeman)
Aphelinus semiflavus Howard
Aphelinus thomsoni Graham
Aphelinus varipes (Foerster)

References

Aphelinidae